Castellar-Oliveral is a village in Valencia, Spain. It is part of the municipality of Valencia.

Towns in Spain
Populated places in the Province of Valencia
Geography of Valencia